Michael Figgis (born 28 February 1948) is an English film director, screenwriter, and composer.  He was nominated for two Academy Awards for his work in Leaving Las Vegas (1995). Figgis was the founding patron of the independent filmmakers online community Shooting People.

Early life
Figgis was born in Carlisle, Cumberland, and grew up in Nairobi, Kenya until he was eight.  The rest of his childhood was spent in Newcastle upon Tyne.

Career 
Figgis's early interest was in music. He played trumpet and guitar in The People Band and is audible in their first record (produced by Charlie Watts) in 1968. He also played keyboards for Bryan Ferry's first band. In 1983 he directed a theatre play, produced in Theatre Gerard-Philipe (Saint-Denis, Paris). This play performed with great success at Festival de Grenada and in Theater der Welt (Munich).

After working in theatre (he was a musician and performer in the experimental group People Show) Figgis made his feature film debut with the low budget Stormy Monday in 1988. The film earned him attention as a director who could get interesting performances from established Hollywood actors. His first American film was Internal Affairs, which helped to revive the career of Richard Gere. His next Hollywood feature, Mr. Jones, was misunderstood by the studio, who attempted to market the downbeat story as a feelgood film, resulting in a box office flop. Figgis poured his disenchantment with the film industry into Leaving Las Vegas, which starred Nicolas Cage and Elisabeth Shue, which earned Figgis Academy Award nominations for Best Directing and Best Screenplay. He followed this up with the romantic drama One Night Stand, starring Wesley Snipes and Nastassja Kinski, but the movie received a poor response from critics and was a commercial failure. His most ambitious film to date is the low-budget film The Loss of Sexual Innocence, a loosely based autobiographical film of the director himself.

In 2007, Figgis shot Love Live Long set between Istanbul and Bratislava on the infamous Gumball 3000 Rally, starring Sophie Winkleman and Daniel Lapaine. In 2008, he was called upon by Transport for London to help shoot a PIF entitled A Little Thought From Each of Us, A Big Difference For Everyone, encouraging more considerate behaviour on London's public transport systems, which was then shown in London cinemas. The ad comprised the screen split into four sections, each section showing one of four scenarios all on the same double-decker bus. At the end of the ad, the friction-creating scenarios were resolved and the ad ended on "A little thought from each of us. A big difference for everyone."

Digital video
Forays into digital video technology led Figgis to conceive of and direct Timecode, which took advantage of the technology to create an ensemble film shot simultaneously with four cameras all in one take and also presented simultaneously and uncut, dividing the screen into four-quarters. He returned to the Timecode quad-screen approach for his section of Ten Minutes Older, but has also worked on documentary pieces including a segment of The Blues (called Red, White, and Blues) and a short piece on flamenco. His curiosity with the cinematic use of time has led him to cite Robert Enrico's 1962 film version of An Occurrence at Owl Creek Bridge as an influential film for him. Figgis has a well-documented love-hate relationship with the Hollywood system which leads him to often be an outspoken critic of the system while also despairing the lack of a better alternative. At an appearance at Camerimage in 2005, he expressed the view that filmmaking had become "boring and perhaps need[ed] to become even worse before anything better can emerge" successfully at least in reaction.

At one of the Shooting People events in 2005 he said that filmmaking with a small digital camera made the experience more like painting or novel writing than the movie industry. His fascination with camera technology has also led him to create a camera stabilisation rig for smaller video cameras, called the Fig Rig which places the camera on a platform held within a steering wheel-like system and has since been released by Manfrotto Group.

To promote a new camera phone, Sony Ericsson commissioned Figgis to create Life Captured, a short film made out of mobile phone snapshots taken by 14 people from Europe, the Middle East, and Africa, who were selected to submit a series of photos after winning the global competition.

Educational career
Figgis, since 2008, has been professor of film studies at the European Graduate School in Saas-Fee, Switzerland, where he conducts intensive summer seminars. 

Figgis was made an Honorary Associate of London Film School.

Filmography
The House (1984)
Stormy Monday (1988)
Internal Affairs (1990)
Women & Men 2 (1991)
Liebestraum (1991)
Mr. Jones (1993)
The Browning Version (1994)
Leaving Las Vegas (1995)
Flamenco Women (1997)
One Night Stand (1997)
The Loss of Sexual Innocence (1999)
Miss Julie (1999)
Timecode (2000)
Hotel (2001)
The Battle of Orgreave (2001)
Ten Minutes Older: The Cello (2002) Segment: About Time 2
The Blues (2003) – Episode: Red, White, And Blues
Cold Creek Manor (2003)
The Sopranos – Episode: "Cold Cuts" (2004)
Co/Ma (2004)
Love Live Long (2008)
The Co(te)lette Film (2010)
Suspension of Disbelief (2012)
Mara (2015)
The Battle of Hastings (documentary film) (2017)
Somebody Up There Likes Me (documentary film) (2019)

Bibliography
Mike Figgis: Collected Screenplays 1 – Stormy Monday, Liebestraum, Leaving Las Vegas (2002)
Digital Filmmaking (2007)
The Thirty-Six Dramatic Situations (2017): 978-057130504-9

References

External links

 Wellcome Trust oral-history interview from July 2009
 Mike Figgis Faculty page at European Graduate School (Includes biography, filmography, photos and video lectures)
 
 
 
 Digital Filmmaking book
 A short film for Agent Provocateur
 Interview
 Mike Figgis judged the Film of the Month competition in January 2009 on the independent filmmakers networking site Shooting People. 

1948 births
Living people
Alumni of Middlesex University
English composers
English film directors
English screenwriters
English male screenwriters
English expatriates in Switzerland
Academic staff of European Graduate School
Independent Spirit Award for Best Director winners
People from Carlisle, Cumbria
Screenwriting instructors